The Polish Academy Award for Best Actor is an award given out at the annual Polish Film Awards to honor of an actor who has delivered an outstanding leading performance in the Polish film industry. The award is presented by the Polish Film Academy and was first presented in 1999.

Winners and nominees

Multiple awards and nominations

References

External links
 Polish Film Awards; Official website 

Film awards for lead actor
Polish film awards
Awards established in 1999
1999 establishments in Poland